Brethren Meeting House is a Category C listed building at 26 Gordon Street in Boddam, Aberdeenshire, Scotland. It was formerly a late-Victorian-era Wesleyan church.  A bellcote is on the gable, without a bell but with a "spiky" finial in place.

It fell into dereliction until 2020, when it was renovated.

See also
List of listed buildings in Peterhead, Aberdeenshire

References

External links
Bretheren Meeting House, Boddam - ScottishChurches.org.uk

Buildings and structures in Boddam
Category C listed buildings in Aberdeenshire
Former churches in Scotland